Tinu is a village in Valga Parish, Valga County in southern Estonia. It has a population of 4 (as of December 31, 2011).

References

Villages in Valga County